Rakel Amalia Wärmländer, née Zacharias, (born 3 October 1980) is a Swedish actress. She started with theater work at the age of nine in the play Kalas i Lönneberga at Dramaten in Stockholm. When she was nineteen she moved to New York City and studied  theater at the Neighborhood Playhouse School of the Theatre for one year. After she returned home to Sweden, she started working at Teater Galeasen in Stockholm with the company Darling Desperados, founded by Ulrika Malmgren. She graduated from Teaterhögskolan i Malmö in 2006.

Wärmländer has worked mostly in television and film. She played in the television mini-series Skuggornas hus (1996) where she played the character Tina. She has also played in shows such as Cleo, Skilda världar and Spung. She acted in the Helena Bergström film Se upp för dårarna, and also Hipphipp!, Itzhaks julevangelium and the Martin Beck film Okänd avsändare.

In late 2007, Wärmländer played Pippi Longstocking in the Jonna Nordenskiöld play Pippi Långstrump - världens starkaste, and also the character Tessa in the play Juloratoriet at Stockholms Stadsteater. She performed the voice acting for the character Fio in the animated film Porco Rosso.

She played the lead role in the Swedish feature film Love and Lemons (Swedish: Små citroner gula), which premiered on 20 February 2013. Her real-life friend actress Josephine Bornebusch played her friend in the film. In 2012, she played a role in the Caryl Churchill feminist drama Top Girls at Stockholms Stadsteater. She acted again in a Helena Bergström-directed film in the comedy En underbar jävla jul, where she plays a surrogate mother for her two best friends who are gay and want a child. The film premiered on 13 November 2015.

Personal life
Wärmländer is the daughter of Tom Zacharias and Dorotea Wärmländer. She has two daughters with actor Lars Bringås.

References

1980 births
Actresses from Stockholm
Living people
Swedish film actresses
Swedish stage actresses
Swedish television actresses